Konstantia Nikolaou (born 19 April 1984) is a Cypriot sport shooter.

She participated at the 2018 ISSF World Shooting Championships, winning a medal.

References

External links

Living people
1984 births
Cypriot female sport shooters
Skeet shooters